The 750s decade ran from January 1, 750, to December 31, 759.

Significant people
 Al-Saffah (r. 25 January 750–10 June 754)
 Al-Mansur (r. 754–775)
 Abu Hanifa
 Pope Stephen II
 Pope Paul I

Notes

References